List of banks registered on the island of Guernsey, based on list of licensed banking institutions from the Guernsey Financial Services Commission

ABN Amro (Guernsey) Limited
Bank J. Safra Sarasin Limited, Guernsey Branch
Bank Julius Baer & Co. Ltd, Guernsey Branch
Bank of Cyprus (Channel Islands)
Banque cantonale vaudoise, Guernsey Branch
Barclays Bank PLC, Guernsey Branch
Barclays Private Clients International Limited, Guernsey Branch
BNP Paribas (Suisse) SA, Guernsey Branch
BNP Paribas Securities Services Custody Bank Limited, Guernsey Branch
Butterfield Bank (Guernsey) Limited
Credit Suisse (Channel Islands) Limited
Credit Suisse A.G., Guernsey Branch
Deutsche Bank International Limited – Guernsey Branch
EFG Private Bank (Channel Islands) Limited
HSBC Bank Plc, Guernsey Branch
HSBC Private Bank (C.I.) Limited
HSBC Private Bank (Suisse) S.A., Guernsey Branch
Investec Bank (Channel Islands) Limited
Kleinwort Benson (Channel Islands) Limited
Lloyds Bank International Limited – Guernsey Branch
Northern Trust (Guernsey) Limited
Rothschild Bank (CI) Limited
Rothschild Bank International Limited
Royal Bank of Canada (Channel Islands) Limited
Royal Bank of Scotland International Limited, Guernsey Branch
Schroders (C.I.) Limited
SG Hambros Bank (Channel Islands) Limited – Guernsey Branch
Skipton Guernsey

References

Economy of Guernsey
Guernsey-related lists
Guernsey
Companies of Guernsey
Guernsey
Lists of companies of the United Kingdom
Guernsey